Kupon-e Vosta (also Romanized as Kūpon-e Vosţá; also known as Kovīn-e Vasaţ, Kūpān-e Vosţá, and Kūpon-e Mīānī) is a village in Rostam-e Seh Rural District, Sorna District, Rostam County, Fars Province, Iran. At the 2006 census, its population was 568, in 111 families.

References 

Populated places in Rostam County